A matchstick is a slender piece of flammable wood used as a match.

Other uses include:

Matchstick Banksia or Banksia cuneata, a flowering plant
Matchstick girl, a variant name of the fictional character "The Little Match Girl"
Matchstick graph, a type of geometric graph
Matchstick Men, a 2003 American film
Matchstick model, a style of scale models
Matchstick Palace, historic building in Sweden
Matchstick Productions, an American film production company
Matchstick Sun, rock music group
Matchstick TV, a brand of digital media player